1000 Main, formerly Reliant Energy Plaza, is a  tall skyscraper in Downtown Houston, Texas managed by Transwestern.

1000 Main was constructed from 2001 to 2003 and has 36 floors. It is the 25th tallest building in Houston. It is made out of glass, steel, and concrete. Lights atop the building and on the main street side flash in patterns of various colors at night. This building occupies the site where the Lamar Hotel stood before it was demolished in 1985. A two-level trading floor with 30 ft high ceilings, currently leased by the trading arm of Shell plc, is located on the 10th and 11th floors. It is squeezed between the garage and the office tower. Century development built the Reliant Energy Plaza. During the same year two subsidiaries of Marsh & McLennan Companies, Marsh USA and Mercer Human Resource Consulting, had a combined  of space in the building. The Reliant Energy Plaza was 86% leased in 2003.

Gallery

See also

List of tallest buildings in Houston

References

External links
Emporis
Skyscraperpage

Skyscraper office buildings in Houston
Office buildings completed in 2003
Buildings and structures in Houston